APS Payroll, also known as Automatic Payroll Systems, is an American company that provides cloud-based payroll and human resources software for mid-sized businesses. The company was founded in 1996 as a licensed DOS-based software to process payroll locally. The company's headquarters is located in Shreveport, Louisiana.

History
APS Payroll was founded in 1996 as Automatic Payroll Systems in Shreveport, Louisiana. It began as a payroll processing and full-service tax compliance service provider. In 2000, the company developed its own cloud-based technology.

The first version of attendance was released in 2001.

In 2004, APS Payroll submitted The first payroll was submitted online and the first version of its core HR solution was released.

APS Payroll expanded its HR solution to include benefits administration in 2007.

The Attendance solution was expanded to include shift differentials and clock rules in 2010.

APS Payroll released its mobile self-service site for employees and managers in 2013. 

In 2014, APS Payroll released ClockZones geofencing time tracking, event tracking, carrier connections, and ACA tracking and reporting.

APS Payroll completed the SOC 1 Type 1 report audit in 2015. 

In 2017, APS Payroll released its scheduling product and native integration with Sage Intacct and its General Ledger product.

APS Payroll launched its native mobile app to replace its mobile site in 2018.

In 2020, APS Payroll released its COVID-19 tracking and reporting features for FFCRA tax credits and CARES Act compliance.

APS Payroll earned the 2021 Tech Cares Award from TrustRadius for its workplace culture.

In 2022, APS Payroll was recognized by G2 as a Top 50 HR Software Product and a Top 100 Highest Satisfaction Product.

References

External Links

1996 establishments in Louisiana
Business services companies of the United States
Companies based in Shreveport, Louisiana
Business services companies established in 1996
Financial services companies established in 1996
Payroll
Cloud computing
Human resource management